Charles Armstrong may refer to:

People

Politicians
Charles F. Armstrong (Pennsylvania politician) (c. 1866–1934), American politician
Charles F. Armstrong (Illinois politician) (1919–1965), member of the Illinois House of Representatives
Charles Armstrong (politician) (fl. 2006–2017), member of the Arkansas House of Representatives

Sports
Charles Armstrong (rower) (1881–1952), American rower who won a medal at the 1904 Summer Olympics
Charles Armstrong (baseball) (1914–1990), American professional baseball player and football coach
Charlie Armstrong (footballer) (1883–1954), Australian rules footballer
Charlie Armstrong (American football) (1923–2002), American football halfback and fullback
Chuck Armstrong (fl. 1960s–2014), U.S. Navy officer and president of the Seattle Mariners Major League Baseball club

Other people
Charles Armstrong (physician) (1886–1967), American physician in the U.S. Public Health Service 
Charles Armstrong (British Army officer)  (1897–1985), British military officer
Charles Armstrong (Northern Ireland) (born c. 1926), suspected victim of the Provisional IRA
Charles Armstrong (ethnographer) (born 1971), British ethnographer and technologist
Charles K. Armstrong (born 1962), professor of Korean Studies at Columbia University involved in a plagiarism and falsification controversy
Charles L. Armstrong (1944–2011), United States Marine Corps officer
Charles Spearman Armstrong (1847–1924), pioneer tea and cinchona planter in British Ceylon
Charles Armstrong-Jones (born 1999), great-nephew of Queen Elizabeth II

Other uses
Charles Armstrong School, California